Hard Liquor, Soft Music is an album by The Blackeyed Susans, recorded in late 1993 by Rob Snarski, Phil Kakulas and Graham Lee as The Blackeyed Susans Trio.

Track listing 
 "Bird on the Wire" (Leonard Cohen) - 4:10
 "Happiness" (G. Appel) - 3:41
 "Trouble" (Phil Kakulas, Timothy Rollinson) - 3:28
 "Delta Dawn" (Alex Harvey, Larry Collins) - 2:51
 "Summer Leaves" (P. Kelly) - 3:31
 "Lost Highway" (Leon Payne) - 3:12
 "Life's Little Ups & Downs" (M.A. Rich) - 3:32
 "Ocean of You" (David McComb) - 3:26
 "One Day at a Time" (G. Appel) - 2:39
 "In the Pines" (David McComb) - 3:09
 "20/20 Vision" (Joe Allison, Milton Estes) - 3:21
 "Lonesome Town" (Baker Knight) 3:22

Personnel 
 Rob Snarski – vocals, acoustic guitar
 Phil Kakulas – double bass
 Graham Lee – vocals, pedal steel, electric guitar, piano on "Delta Dawn"
 Chris Copping – piano on "Life’s Little Ups & Downs"

References

1994 albums
The Blackeyed Susans albums